Radical chrétien  (Christian radical) was a label used by several candidates in Canadian federal elections in the 1950s and 1960s.

In the 1958 federal election, Georges Rousseau unsuccessfully sought election in Mercier riding in Quebec as a Radical chrétien candidate. He won 687 votes, 1.3% of the total.

On 29 May 1967, Radical chrétien candidates ran in three federal by-elections in Quebec ridings. Together, they won 10,506 votes, or 10.3% of the popular votes in the ridings in which they ran:

René Villeneuve, the candidate in Hull riding, placed second in a field of five candidates, with 8,715 votes, 38.4% of the total. 
Albert Paiement won 702 votes (6.6%) in Papineau.
 Rolland Corbeil won 1,089 votes (6.8%) in Richelieu—Verchères riding.
Source:

See also
 List of political parties in Canada

References

Federal political parties in Canada
Christian radicalism